Nikola is a given name which, like Nicholas, is a version of the Greek Nikolaos (Νικόλαος). It is common as a masculine given name in the South Slavic countries (Bosnia and Herzegovina, Bulgaria, Croatia, North Macedonia, Montenegro, Serbia), while in West Slavic countries (Czech Republic, Poland, Slovakia) it is primarily found as a feminine given name. There is a wide variety of male diminutives of the name, examples including: Niko, Nikolica, Nidžo, Nikolče, Nikša, Nikica, Nikulitsa, Nino, Kole, Kolyo, Kolyu.

The spelling with K, Nikola, reflects romanization of the Cyrillic spelling, while Nicola reflects Italian usage.

Statistics
Serbia: male name. 5th most popular in 2011, 1st in 2001, 1st in 1991, 5th in 1981, 9th pre-1940.
Croatia: male name. 32,304 (2011).
Bosnia and Herzegovina: male name.
Bulgaria: male name.
 North Macedonia: male name.
Czech Republic: 22,567 females and 740 males (2002).
Poland: female name.
Slovakia: female name.
Slovenia: male name. 2003 males

People with the name

Arts
 Nikola Avramov, Bulgarian painter
 Nikola Hajdin, President of Serbian Academy of Sciences and Arts
 Nikola Kastner (born 1983), German actress
 Nikola Kojo, Serbian actor
 Nikola Martinovski, Macedonian painter
 Nikola Nešković, Serbian painter
 Nikola Vaptsarov, Bulgarian poet

Music
 Nikola Mijailović (singer), Serbian opera singer
 Nikola Resanovic, Serbian-American composer
 Nikola Sarcevic, Swedish thrash rock musician
 Nikola Kołodziejczyk, Polish jazz pianist, composer and arranger

Politics
 Vlgdrag or monk Nikola (d. 1327), Serbian nobleman
 Nikola Altomanović (fl. 1371–73), Serbian prince
 Nikola Skobaljić (fl. 1454), Serbian general
 Nikola Frankopan, Croatian ban
 Nikola IV Zrinski, Croatian-Hungarian ban and hero of Siege of Szigetvár
 Nicholas I of Montenegro, King of Montenegro
 Prince Nikola of Yugoslavia (1928–1954), Serbian prince
 Nikola, Crown Prince of Montenegro (born 1944), Montenegrin prince
 Nikola Gruevski, Macedonian Prime minister
 Nikola Jorgic, Bosnian Serb soldier
 Nikola Karev, Macedonian revolutionary
 Nikola Kavaja, Serbian anti-communists
 Nikola Kljusev, Macedonian politician
 Nikola Ljubičić, Serbian politician
 Nikola Mandić, Croatian politician
 Nikola Milošević (politician), Serbian intellectual
 Nikola Mushanov, Bulgarian politician
 Nikola Pašić, Serbian politician and diplomat
 Nikola Petkov, Bulgarian politician
 Nikola Šećeroski, Serbian politician
 Nikola Špirić, Bosnian Serb politician
 Nikola Uzunović, Serbian politician
 Nikola Vitov Gučetić, Ragusian statesman
 Nikola Zhekov, Bulgarian military

Science
 Nikola Moravčević, Serbian academic
 Nikola Obreshkov, Bulgarian mathematician
 Nikola Tesla, Serbian-American inventor and mechanical engineer
 Nikola Moushmov, Bulgarian historian

Sports
 Nikola Brejchová, Czech athlete
 Nikola Dragović, Serbian basketball player
 Nikola Grbić, Serbian volleyball player
 Nikola Jakšić, Serbian water polo player, Olympic champion
 Nikola Jerkan, Croatian footballer
 Nikola Jokić, Serbian basketball player
 Nikola Jovanović, Montenegrin footballer
 Nikola Jovović, Serbian volleyball player
 Nikola Jurčević, Croatian footballer
 Nikola Kalinić, Serbian basketball player
 Nikola Karabatić, French team handball player
 Nikola Katić, Croatian football player
 Nikola Kotkov, Bulgarian footballer
 Nikola Kovachev, Bulgarian footballer
 Nikola Kovačević, Serbian volleyball player
 Niko Kranjčar, Croatian footballer
 Nikola Kuljača, Serbian waterpolo goalkeeper
 Nikola Lazetić, Serbian footballer
 Nikola Lončar, Serbian basketball player
 Nikola Maraš, Serbian footballer
 Nikola Mijailović, Serbian footballer
 Nikola Milojević, Serbian football goalkeeper
 Nikola Milošević, Serbian football midfielder
 Nikola Mirotić, Spanish basketball player of Montenegrin descent
 Nikola Nikezić, Montenegrin footballer
 Nikola Nikić, Bosnian Serb footballer
 Nikola Nimac, Croatian racer
 Nikola Peković, Montenegrin basketball player
 Nikola Petroff, Bulgarian wrestler
 Nikola Pilić, Yugoslav Croat professional tennis player
 Nikola Rosić, Serbian volleyball player
 Nikola Stojić, Serbian rower
 Nikola Sudová, Czech freestyle skier
 Nikola Vignjević, Serbian footballer
 Nikola Vlašić, Croatian footballer
 Nikola Vučević, Montenegrin basketball player
 Nikola Vujčić (born 1978), Croatian basketball player and team manager of Maccabi Tel Aviv
 Nikola Žigić, Serbian footballer

Other
 Nikola Modruški, Croatian catholic priest
 Nikola Radosavljević, Serbian mass murderer
 Nicholas Nikola Ribic, Serbian-Canadian convicted for hostaging
 Nikola Motor Company, an American-based electric semi-truck design company based in Salt Lake City, Utah

Fictional characters 
 Doctor Nikola, a fictional supervillain in works of Guy Boothby

See also 
 Nicola (name)
 Nikolić, surname
 Nikolov
 Nikolovski
Nikola Corporation

References

Bosnian masculine given names
Bulgarian masculine given names
Croatian masculine given names
Czech feminine given names
Macedonian masculine given names
Russian masculine given names
Serbian masculine given names
Slovak feminine given names
Ukrainian masculine given names
Polish feminine given names
Unisex given names